Black Beauty is a 1921 American silent film version of Anna Sewell's 1877 novel of the same name. Black Beauty is an autobiography of a horse, who tells the story of his life and of the people surrounding it. This film exists in an incomplete state with four of seven reels preserved at the Library of Congress.

A competing/rival independent film of the same story was also released in early 1921 starring Claire Adams and Pat O'Malley. It was produced by Eskay Harris Feature Film Company.

Plot 
As summarized in a film publication, a human love story was added to the horse story, which includes a fox hunt and race. At a house party given by Squire Gordon (Steppling), his daughter Jessie (Paige) and Harry Blomefield (Morrison) are playing games with the children, although they have reached the age where Harry realizes that he loves her. Among the guests is Jack Beckett (Webb), who lives by his wits and has gained entree as a favorite of the haughty Lady Wynsaring (Farrington). Squire Gordon gives Lord Wynwaring (Peacocke) £800 for his wife's charity, which Jack steals from the Wynwaring room. During a fox hunt the next morning, Jessie's brother George (Kenny) is killed in a fall from his horse. Jack puts the stolen money in the pocket of the dead man and tells Jessie that her brother was a thief. To prevent him from telling her mother, Jessie agrees to marry Jack when she comes of age. Jessie meanwhile realizes that she loves Harry, who cannot understand her wish to marry Jack. Several years pass and Harry tries to elope with Jessie, but is foiled. After a race sequence, Black Beauty carries Harry to victory and to Jessie, foiling the plans of the villain Jack.

Cast 
 Jean Paige as Jessie Gordon
 James Morrison as Harry Blomefield
 George Webb as Jack Beckett
 Bobby Mack as Derby Ghost
 John Steppling as Squire Gordon
 Leslie T. Peacocke as Lord Wynwaring
 Adele Farrington as Lady Wynsaring
 Chick Morrison as John Manly
 Mollie McConnell as Mrs. Gordon (*posthumous release for Mollie, she died in 1920)
 Colin Kenny as George Gordon
 Georgia French as Flora Gordon
 Robert Bolder as Vicar Blomefield
 Margaret Mann as Mrs. Blomefield
 George C. Pearce as Farmer Grey
 James Connelly as Fat Bailiff
 Robert Milasch as Lean Bailiff
 James Donnelly

Production 
For its 1929 re-release, the film was cut to 35 minutes.

References

External links 

 
 

1921 drama films
1921 films
Films based on Black Beauty
Silent American drama films
American silent feature films
Films directed by David Smith (director)
American black-and-white films
1920s American films